Testo can refer to:
 Trade name for the drug Tiabendazole
 David Testo (b. 1981), American soccer player
 Testo (rapper) (b. 1988), German rapper
 In early oratorio, narrator
 Testo SE, German company that manufactures measuring equipment
 Colloquial abbreviation for testosterone